efbet Arena is a multi-purpose stadium in Burgas, Bulgaria.  It is currently used for football matches and is the home ground of Neftochimic 1962 Burgas.  The stadium holds 18,037 people and carries a 3-star rating by UEFA. It was opened in 1967 and was renovated between 1990 and 1997. Officially opened after renovation at 13 April 1997 with the match Neftochimik - Levski Sofia 4:1. Until 2002 the stadium was named "Neftochimic" and later "Naftex".

The stadium was used by PFC Chernomorets Burgas between 2006 and 2015, even though they had plans to move to a new stadium in the future. It was used also in some European matches of Litex Lovech (for the UEFA Champions League match against FC Spartak Moscow), PFC Lokomotiv Plovdiv (for UEFA Champions League match against Club Brugge and for UEFA Cup matches against OFK Beograd and Bolton Wanderers F.C.) and PFC Cherno More Varna (for UEFA Intertoto match against UC Sampdoria and for the UEFA Europa League matches against Iskra-Stal and PSV Eindhoven).

During several renovations of the Vasil Levski National Stadium the Bulgaria national football team has played some of their home matches at "Lazur".
In the summer of 2009, the stadium underwent some serious upgrades, which included replacing the yellow-green seats with blue ones, as well as increasing the roof covers of the stadium to 10 meters.
During the summer of 2015 the stadium was one of 4 venues hosting the 2015 UEFA European Under-17 Championship. It hosted 11 games in total, including the final, which had an official attendance of 14,680.

National team matches

Bulgarian Cup & Supercup finals

See also 
 Chernomorets Stadium

References

External links
  Official website of the football club

Multi-purpose stadiums in Bulgaria
Football venues in Bulgaria
Sports venues in Burgas